Oxford United is an English professional association football club based in Oxford, Oxfordshire. They play in League One, the third level of the English football league system, as of the 2019–20 season. The club was formed in 1893 as Headington United, before changing its name (to Oxford United) in 1960, and has played home matches at two stadiums throughout its history, the Manor Ground until 2001, and the Kassam Stadium since. In 1986 they won their only major trophy, the League Cup. The club joined the Oxfordshire Senior League in 1921, before joining the Spartan League in 1947. Two years later the club moved to the Southern League, before being elected to the Football League in 1962. Oxford spent three years in the First Division between August 1985 and May 1988. At the end of the 2005–06 season, after 44 years in the League, United were relegated to the Football Conference. They returned to the League after winning the Conference National Play-off Final in 2010.

The record for most games played for the club is held by Ron Atkinson, who made 560 appearances between 1959 and 1971. John Shuker holds the record for the most appearances since they joined the Football League. Graham Atkinson is the club's record goalscorer, scoring 107 goals including 97 in the league.  Jim Magilton holds the record for the most international caps gained as an Oxford player, having made 18 appearances for Northern Ireland.  The highest transfer fee ever paid by the club is the £470,000 paid to Aberdeen for Dean Windass in 1998, though it has been reported that the undisclosed fee paid for Marvin Johnson in 2016 exceeded this amount, and the highest fee received is the estimated £3,000,000 paid by Leeds United for Kemar Roofe in 2016. The highest attendance recorded at the Manor Ground was 22,750 for the visit of Preston North End in the FA Cup, while the highest attendance at the Kassam is 12,243 against Leyton Orient.

Honours and achievements

Oxford United's only major honour in English football is the League Cup, which the club won in the 1985–86 season, defeating Queen's Park Rangers in the final 3–0. The club has also won the Third Division championship twice and the Second Division championship once. The latter Third Division, Second Division and League Cup victories all occurred within the space of two years. United also achieved promotion from the Fourth Division after the 1964–65 season. Oxford's highest top-flight finish is eighteenth, which was achieved twice in two years, starting in 1986. The most recent promotion occurred after the 2009–10 season, when they beat York City 3–1 in the Conference National play-off final.

Oxford's best performance in the FA Cup involved reaching the quarter-finals against Preston North End in the 1963–64 season. In doing so, they became the first team to reach that stage from the Fourth Division. Before the club were admitted to the Football League in 1962, they won the Southern Football League championship on three occasions, the final win occurring the season before election into the Fourth Division, and finished runner-up twice. They also won the Southern League Cup twice.

The Football League
Before the Premier League
Second Division (level 2): Champions 1984–85
Third Division (level 3): Champions 1967–68, 1983–84
Fourth Division (level 4): Promoted (3rd) 1964–65
After the formation of the Premier League
Division Two (level 3): Runners-up 1995–96
League Two (level 4): Runners-up 2015–16

Other honours
 Southern League
Premier Division: Champions 1952–53, 1960–61, 1961–62
 Premier Division: Runners-up 1953–54, 1959–60
 Southern League Cup
Winners: 1952–53, 1953–54
 Football Conference
Conference National Play-off winners: 2009–10

National cup competitions
FA Cup
Quarter finalists: 1963–64
 League Cup
Winners: 1986
 Football League Trophy
Runners-up: 2016, 2017

Player records

Age
Youngest first-team player: Tyler Goodrham, 16 years, 98 days (against Crawley Town, 12 November 2019).
Oldest first-team player: Alan Judge,  (against Southend United, 6 November 2004).

Appearances
Appearances are for matches in the Football League, Conference National, Southern League, FA Cup, Football League Cup, Football League Trophy, Football League Group Cup, Anglo-Italian Cup, Full Members Cup, FA Trophy and Southern League Cup. Substitute appearances are included in brackets. Statistics correct as of 8 March 2021.

a. Includes Football League, Conference National and Southern Football League.
b. Includes Football League Cup and Southern League Cup.
c. Includes Football League Trophy, Football League Group Cup, Anglo-Italian Cup, Full Members Cup and FA Trophy.

Goalscorers
Most goals in a season: Bud Houghton, 43 goals (including 39 Southern League goals) in the 1961–62 season.
Most goals in a season during Football League membership: John Aldridge, 34 goals (including 30 League goals) in the 1984–85 season.
Most Football League goals in a season: John Aldridge, 30 goals in Division Two in the 1984–85 season.
Most goals in a Southern League match:
5, Bud Houghton (against Boston United, 12 April 1961).
5, Tony Jones (against Wisbech Town, 10 December 1960).
Most goals in a Football League match: 4 goals, achieved by 6 players.

Top goalscorers
Goals are for matches in the Football League, Conference National, Southern League, FA Cup, Football League Cup, Football League Trophy, Football League Group Cup, Anglo-Italian Cup, Full Members Cup, FA Trophy, Conference League Cup and Southern League Cup. Appearances are included in brackets. Players in bold are current players. Statistics correct as of 8 March 2021.

a. Includes Football League, Conference National and Southern Football League.
b. Includes Football League Cup and Southern League Cup.
c. Includes Conference play-off, Football League Trophy, Football League Group Cup, Anglo-Italian Cup, Full Members Cup, FA Trophy and Conference League Cup.
d. Where two players scored the same number of goals, the player with the fewer appearances is listed first.

International caps

First capped player: David Sloan, for Northern Ireland on 10 September 1968 against Israel.
Most international caps while an Oxford player: Jim Magilton, 18 for Northern Ireland

Transfer fees

Record transfer fees paid

Progressive transfer fee paid
Progressive transfer fee shows the chronological order in which the record transfer fee was set, and the transfer that set it.

Record transfer fees received

Progressive transfer fee received
Progressive transfer fee shows the chronological order in which the record transfer fee was set, and the transfer that set it.

Managerial records

First professional manager: Harry Thompson (appointed in 1949)
Longest serving manager: Arthur Turner, managed the club from 1959 until 1969
Most spells as manager: 3, Darren Patterson and Jim Smith (each including one spell as caretaker manager)

Club records

Goals
Most Football League goals scored in a season: 91 in 46 matches, Division Three (level 3), 1983–84.
Fewest Football League goals scored in a season: 34 in 42 matches, Division Two (level 2), 1968–69.
Most Football League goals conceded in a season: 100 in 46 matches, Division Two (level 3), 2000–01.
Fewest Football League goals conceded in a season: 36 in 42 matches, Division Two (level 2), 1984–85.
Most league goals scored in a season at any level: 118 in 42 matches, Southern Football League. 1961–62.

Points
Most points in a Football League season:
Two points for a win: 61 in 46 games, Division Four (level 4), 1964–65.
Three points for a win: 95 in 46 games,a Division Three (level 3), 1983–84.
Fewest points in a Football League season:
Two points for a win: 33 in 42 games, Division Two (level 2), 1975–76.
Three points for a win: 27 in 46 games,b Division Two (level 3), 2000–01.
a. Also the most points won in a season at any level.
b. Also the fewest points won in a season at any level.

Matches

Firsts
First match: Headington 1–2 Cowley Barracks, friendly, 25 November 1893.
First FA Cup match: Headington United 2–8 Hounslow, extra preliminary qualifying round, 5 September 1931.
First Spartan League match: Marlow 1–2 Headington United, 30 August 1947.
First Southern League match: Hastings United 2–5 Headington United, 20 August 1949.
First Football League match: Barrow 3–2 Oxford United, Division Four (level 4), 18 August 1962.
First Football League Cup match: Torquay United 2–0 Oxford United, first round, 1 September 1962.

Record wins
Record Football League home win: 7–0 against Barrow in Division Four (level 4), 19 December 1964.
Record Football League away win: 6–0, against Lincoln City in League One (level 3), 21 September 2019, and against Crewe Alexandra, also in League One, 10 April 2021.
Record FA Cup win: 9–1 against Dorchester Town, first round, 11 November 1995.
Record League Cup win: 6–0 against Gillingham, second round first leg, 24 September 1986.
Record win in any match: 9–0 against Wisbech Town in the Southern League, 10 December 1960.

Record defeat
Record Football League defeat: 0–7 against Sunderland in Division One (level 2), 19 September 1998, and against Wigan Athletic in League One (level 3), 23 December 2017.
Record League Cup defeat: 0–5 against Nottingham Forest, third round, 4 October 1978.

Sequences
Successive wins in all competitions: 9, 2020-21 Season
Successive wins in the Football League: 7, League One (level 3), 2020-21 Season
Successive games unbeaten in all competitions: 19, 2006-07 Season
Successive games unbeaten in the Football League: 15, 1990-91 Season

Attendances
Largest home attendance
Manor Ground: 22,750 against Preston North End, FA Cup quarter-final, 29 February 1964.
Kassam Stadium: 12,243 against Leyton Orient, Football League Two (level 4), 6 May 2006.
Highest home Football League attendance: 18,740 against Birmingham City, Division Two (level 2), 31 March 1972.
Highest attendance played in front of anywhere: 90,396 against Queen's Park Rangers at Wembley Stadium, League Cup final, 20 April 1986.

Footnotes
A.  In this instance a major trophy refers to either the First Division/Premier League, the FA Cup or the League Cup.

B.  Unless otherwise stated, Statistics taken from Brodetsky. Oxford United: The Complete Record, p. 365

C.  Figures were undisclosed, but are believed to have been in the region of the amount stated.

D.  Maurice Kyle was previously on loan from Wolves.

E.  Unless otherwise stated, Statistics taken from Brodetsky. Oxford United: The Complete Record, p. 366

References
General
 
 

Specific

Records and Statistics
Oxford United
Oxford-related lists